Michael Monroe Lewis (born October 15, 1960) is an American author and financial journalist. He has also been a contributing editor to Vanity Fair since 2009, writing mostly on business, finance, and economics. He is known for his nonfiction work, particularly his coverage of financial crises and behavioral finance.

Lewis was born in New Orleans and attended Princeton University, from which he graduated with a degree in art history. After attending the London School of Economics, he began a career on Wall Street during the 1980s as a bond salesman at Salomon Brothers. The experience prompted him to write his first book, Liar's Poker (1989). Fourteen years later, Lewis wrote Moneyball: The Art of Winning an Unfair Game (2003), in which he investigated the success of Billy Beane and the Oakland Athletics. His 2006 book The Blind Side: Evolution of a Game was his first to be adapted into a film, The Blind Side (2009). In 2010, he released The Big Short: Inside the Doomsday Machine. The film adaptation of Moneyball was released in 2011, followed by The Big Short in 2015.

Lewis's books have won two Los Angeles Times Book Prizes and been notable selection features on the New York Times Bestsellers Lists.

Early life and education
Lewis was born in New Orleans, the son of corporate attorney J. Thomas Lewis and community activist Diana Monroe Lewis. He went to Isidore Newman School. He later attended Princeton University and graduated cum laude with a B.A. in art and archaeology in 1982 after completing a 166-page senior thesis titled "Donatello and the Antique." At Princeton, Lewis was a member of the Ivy Club. He briefly worked with New York City art dealer Daniel Wildenstein. In an interview with Charlie Rose, Lewis said that his initial ambition was to become an art historian, but he was quickly dissuaded once he realized that there would be no jobs available for art historians and that even the handful that existed did not pay well.

Lewis subsequently enrolled at the London School of Economics and received an MA in economics in 1985. He was hired by Salomon Brothers, stayed for a while in New York for its training program, and then relocated to London, where he worked at its London office as a bond salesman for a few years. He has said that the journalism from this era found in The Economist and The Wall Street Journal inspired him to explore becoming a writer.

Career

Writing
Lewis described his experiences at Salomon and the evolution of the mortgage-backed bond in Liar's Poker (1989). In The New New Thing (1999), he investigated the then-booming Silicon Valley and the obsession with innovation. Four years later, Lewis wrote Moneyball (2003), in which he investigated the success of Billy Beane and the Oakland Athletics. In August 2007, he wrote an article about catastrophe bonds, "In Nature's Casino", that ran in The New York Times Magazine.

Lewis has worked for The Spectator, The New York Times Magazine, as a columnist for Bloomberg, as a senior editor and campaign correspondent to The New Republic, and a visiting fellow at the University of California, Berkeley. He wrote the Dad Again column for Slate. Lewis worked for Conde Nast Portfolio, but in February 2009 left to join Vanity Fair, where he became a contributing editor.

In September 2011, after the successful release of the film adaptation of Moneyball, it was reported that Lewis planned to take on "a much more active role in the what could be the next film based on one of his books" and would start writing a script for a Liar's Poker film.

During 2013 in Vanity Fair, Lewis wrote on the injustice of the prosecution of ex-Goldman Sachs programmer Sergey Aleynikov, who is given an entire chapter in Flash Boys. Flash Boys, which looked at high-frequency trading of Wall Street and other markets, was released in March 2014.

In 2016, Lewis published The Undoing Project, chronicling the close academic collaboration and personal relationship between Israeli psychologists Amos Tversky and Daniel Kahneman. The duo found systemic errors in human judgment under uncertainty, with implications for models of decision-making in fields such as economics, medicine, and sports.

In 2017, Lewis wrote a series of articles for Vanity Fair in which he described the Trump administration's approach to various federal agencies, including the Department of Energy and the Department of Agriculture. His articles described a sense of incredulity and disillusionment from career civil servants, particularly because of the Trump administration's lack of attention to some of their work, and the lack of care, knowledge, experience, and respect from Trump political appointees.

That material was incorporated into Lewis's book The Fifth Risk, which was on the New York Times nonfiction best-seller list for 14 weeks,<ref>[Blasdel, Alex, Lewis: The Big Short author on how Trump is gambling with nuclear disaster, The Guardian, September 22, 2018]</ref> and described the disconnect between the Obama administration's well-prepared transition plans and the incoming Trump administration's apparent lack of concern. Along with Energy and Agriculture, this book added Commerce among the main departments described.

In September 2018, The Guardian published an excerpt from the book that used a quote by a top adviser to Trump in its title, and the excerpt was republished again among a review of the most popular articles of the year.

In 2018, Lewis wrote and narrated The Coming Storm for Audible Studios, which released the short nonfiction story as part of its new Audible Originals series of audiobooks.

Broadcasting and podcasts
Lewis's podcast, Against the Rules, first aired on April 2, 2019. The first season comprised seven episodes, each taking on a different aspect of society addressing the concept of fairness "in realms ranging from art authentication to consumer finance". The show often refers to the growing social distrust for authority, and refers to different types of public officials as "referees." Against the Rules is produced by Pushkin Industries, the media company founded by journalist Malcolm Gladwell and former Slate executive Jacob Weisberg.

On January 12, 2020, Lewis appeared as one of the castaways on BBC Radio 4's Desert Island Discs.

Reception
A best-selling author, Lewis has drawn both supporters and vocal detractors. In a review of Moneyball, Dan Ackman of Forbes said that Lewis had a special talent: "He can walk into an area already mined by hundreds of writers and find gems there all along but somehow missed by his predecessors". A New York Times piece said that "no one writes with more narrative panache about money and finance than Mr. Lewis", praising his ability to use his subject's stories to show the problems with the systems around them.
 
Critics from outside the financial industry have criticized Lewis for what they consider inaccuracies in his writing. In a 2011 column in The Atlantic, American journalist and sports author Allen Barra took issue with Lewis's characterization of Major League Baseball in Moneyball, writing, "From a historical standpoint, Lewis is, well, way off base. By the end of the 20th century baseball had achieved a greater level of competitive balance than at any time in the game's history... Moneyball doesn't just get the state of present-day baseball wrong; it also misrepresents the history of the sport."

Lewis's Flash Boys: A Wall Street Revolt ignited a new round of controversy surrounding high-frequency trading. At a House Financial Services Committee hearing in April 2014, Mary Jo White, a former Wall Street insider (as a Debevoise & Plimpton litigations lawyer primarily for Wall Street financial firms) who later served as the U.S. Securities and Exchange Commission (SEC) Chair, denied the book's premise, saying, "The markets are not rigged". In June 2014, White announced that the SEC would undergo a new round of regulatory review in response to concerns about dark pools and market structure.

Book critics widely praised Lewis's The Undoing Project, with Glenn C. Altschuler writing in the Pittsburgh Post-Gazette that it "may well be his best book".

Personal life
Lewis has been married three times. He married his first wife, Diane de Cordova Lewis, in 1985. His second marriage was to former CNBC correspondent Kate Bohner. In October 1997, he married former MTV reporter Tabitha Soren. He and Soren have three children, and reside in Berkeley, California. On May 25, 2021, his daughter Dixie died at age 19, in a head-on collision with a semi-truck near Truckee, California.

Lewis is an atheist.

Awards
 2008 Gerald Loeb Award Honorable Mention for Magazines for "In Nature's Casino"
 2009 Gerald Loeb Award for Feature Writing for "The End"
 2010 Gerald Loeb Award for Feature Writing for "Wall Street on the Tundra"

Bibliography
 
 
 
 
 
 
 
 
 
 
 
 
 
 
 
 
 
 
 
 

See also
2020 United States Census, issues addressed in The Fifth Risk''

References

External links

1960 births
Living people
20th-century American male writers
20th-century American non-fiction writers
21st-century American male writers
21st-century American non-fiction writers
Alumni of the London School of Economics
American atheists
American business and financial journalists
American business theorists
American economics writers
American educators
American finance and investment writers
American male journalists
Gerald Loeb Award winners for Feature
Gerald Loeb Award winners for Magazines
Isidore Newman School alumni
Princeton University alumni
Writers from New Orleans